East Atlanta Santa 3 is a commercial mixtape by American rapper Gucci Mane. It was released on December 20, 2019 by Atlantic Records and GUWOP Enterprises. The mixtape is Gucci Mane's third project of 2019, following June 2019's Delusions of Grandeur and October 2019's Woptober II, and features 16 tracks. The project includes guest appearances from Kranium, Jason Derulo, Asian Doll, Rich the Kid and Quavo.

Singles
The lead single off the mixtape is "Jingle Bales Intro", which was released alongside the project on December 20, 2019. Its music video premiered on Gucci Mane's YouTube channel on December 18, 2019, two days before its actual official release. The second single released is "She Miss Me", which released on December 20, 2019, alongside the mixtape. It has a guest appearance from American rapper Rich the Kid. Its music video arrived on the same day as the song.

Track listing
Credits adapted from Tidal, HipHopDX, and Gucci Mane's Instagram.

Charts

References

2019 albums
Gucci Mane albums
Albums produced by Zaytoven
Albums produced by Metro Boomin
Albums produced by Honorable C.N.O.T.E.
Albums produced by J. White Did It
Albums produced by Murda Beatz